General Sir Daril Gerard Watson  (17 October 1888 − 1 July 1967) was a senior British Army officer who saw service during both World War I and World War II.

Early life and military career
Born on 17 October 1888, Daril Watson was educated at Mercers' School and, upon the outbreak of World War I in August 1914, enlisted into the British Army, joining the 10th Battalion, Royal Fusiliers. He was commissioned into the Highland Light Infantry the following year, serving with the regiment's 12th Battalion, and awarded the Military Cross (MC) in 1917, the same year of his marriage.

Between the wars
After attending the Staff College, Camberley from 1924 to 1925, he transferred to the Duke of Cornwall's Light Infantry (DCLI) in 1928, becoming Commanding officer (CO) of the 1st Battalion, DCLI in 1934. In 1937 he was appointed Commandant of the Senior Officers' School, Belgaum in India.

He saw service in World War II, initially as a brigadier on the General Staff at Eastern Command and then moving on to the General Staff of III Corps.

World War II
He was appointed General Officer Commanding (GOC) of the 2nd Infantry Division in India in 1940 and Director of Staff Duties at the War Office in 1941. In 1942 he was appointed Assistant Chief of the Imperial General Staff (ACIGS) and then Deputy Adjutant General. In 1944 he moved on to be General Officer Commanding-in-Chief (GOC-in-C) for Western Command.

Postwar
Promoted to general on 17 August 1946, he became Quartermaster-General to the Forces in 1946 and retired in 1947.

Retirement
During retirement he became a member of the board of the British Transport Commission.

References

Bibliography

External links
British Army Officers 1939−1945
Generals of World War II

|-

|-
 

|-
 

|-
 

|-

1888 births
1967 deaths
British Army generals of World War II
British Army personnel of World War I
British Transport Commission
Commandants of the Senior Officers' School, Belgaum
Commanders of the Legion of Merit
Commanders of the Order of the British Empire
Duke of Cornwall's Light Infantry officers
Graduates of the Staff College, Camberley
Highland Light Infantry officers
Knights Grand Cross of the Order of the Bath
People educated at Mercers' School
People from Edmonton, London
Recipients of the Military Cross
Royal Fusiliers soldiers
War Office personnel in World War II
Military personnel from London